The Bulgarian Open (also known as the Victoria Bulgarian Open for sponsorship reasons) was a pro–am minor-ranking snooker tournament, which was part of the Players Tour Championship. The tournament started in 2012 and was staged at the Princess Hotel in Sofia, Bulgaria, and then moved to the Universiada Hall in 2013.

Winners

References

External links
  

 
Recurring sporting events established in 2012
2012 establishments in Bulgaria
Players Tour Championship
2015 disestablishments in Bulgaria
Defunct snooker competitions
Recurring sporting events disestablished in 2015
Sports competitions in Sofia